The Elliot Formation is a geological formation and forms part of the Stormberg Group, the uppermost geological group that comprises the greater Karoo Supergroup. Outcrops of the Elliot Formation have been found in the northern Eastern Cape, southern Free State, and in the eastern KwaZulu-Natal provinces of South Africa. Outcrops and exposures are also found in several localities in Lesotho such as Qacha's Neck, Hill Top, Quthing, and near the capital, Maseru. The Elliot Formation is further divided into the lower (LEF) and upper (UEF) Elliot formations to differentiate significant sedimentological differences between these layers. The LEF is dominantly Late Triassic (Norian-Hettangian) in age while the UEF is mainly Early Jurassic (Sinemurian-Pliensbachian) and is tentatively regarded to preserve a continental record of the Triassic-Jurassic boundary in southern Africa. This geological formation is named after the town of Elliot in the Eastern Cape, and its stratotype locality is located on the Barkly Pass, 9 km north of the town.

Geology 
The Elliot Formation unconformably overlies the Molteno Formation and is conformably overlain by the Clarens Formation. Due to the reddish colour of the rocks, the Elliot Formation is colloquially referred to as the “Red Beds” in older geologic literature.

The Elliot Formation is dominated by mudstones and siltstones that can be finely laminated. However, the internal structures in the mudstones are often not visible due to locally poor laminations. Calcareous nodules are also found in the mudstone layers and become more frequent up section into the UEF. The mudstones range in colour from greyish purple red in the LEF and turn a more brick red colour with more mature palaeosols in the UEF. Localized intraformational pebble conglomerates that comprise intrabasinal clasts that comprise mud chips, quartzite pebbles, pedogenic nodules, and fossil bone fragments only occur in the UEF. The lower and upper Elliot formations both contain sandstones but they vary in their internal geometries. The sandstones of the LEF mainly comprise laterally accreting channel deposits that are multi-story and contain trough, low angle, and planar, cross-bedding. Ripple cross laminations with good horizontal lamination are also present. In the UEF, sandstone beds are single story and mainly reflect downstream accretion channel geometries and are more tabular in appearance. Common internal sedimentary structures of UEF sandstones are planar, low angle cross-bedding, horizontal and ripple-cross laminations.

The LEF was deposited in a fluvio-lacustrine environment where rivers were more perennial and formed meandering channel geometries, as evidenced by the presence of lateral accretion. However, this depositional environment changed at the onset of the UEF deposits where evidence of shallower river channels, longer periods of floodplain stasis (mature palaeosols) and flash flood events (pedogenic nodule conglomerates) shows that the climate became more arid.

Correlation 

The Elliot Formation is currently considered to correlate chronostratigraphically with geological formations of the Bodibeng Sandstone of the Tuli Basin in Botswana, the Omingonde Formation of the Etjo Basin in Namibia, and the Chinle Formation of the Colorado Plateau in Utah, United States.

Paleontology 

The Elliot Formation is well known for its diverse dinosaur fossils. The most common dinosaur species is of the sauropodomorph species Massospondylus carinatus. Other species include Blikanasaurus cromptoni, Aardonyx celestae, Euskelosaurus browni, Antetonitrus ingenipes, Pulanesaura eocollum, and the largest sauropodomorph yet found, Ledumahadi mafube. Fossilised Massospondylus eggs, some with the fossilized remains of embryos intact, have been recovered from UEF deposits in the Golden Gate Highlands National Park. Euskelosaurus fossils are more common in the LEF while Massospondylus are only found in the UEF. The basal ornithischian dinosaurs, Heterodontosaurus tucki, Lesothosaurus diagnosticus, Abrictosaurus consors, and Lycorhinus angustidens have also been recovered from the UEF. In addition this formation has yielded various crocodylomorph species, namely Litargosuchus leptorhynchus, Sphenosuchus acutus and Orthosuchus stormbergi. A large theropod dinosaur, Dracovenator regenti, has been found in the UEF. Synapsids from the formation include the dicynodont Pentasaurus goggai the tritheledontid cynodont Elliotherium kersteni and the mammaliaform Megazostrodon rudnerae. More recent vertebrate fossil finds near the town Qhemegha in the Eastern Cape have yielded possible fossil material of a poposauroid pseudosuchian. The mudstones of the LEF sometimes yield petrified wood, fossil plant matter, crustaceans, fishes, and turtles while the sandstones of the upper Elliot Formation more often contain various trace fossils. These include vertebrate trackways of basal ornithischian dinosaurs found in the Leribe, Mafeteng, and Mohales Hoek Districts of Lesotho. Possible trackways of the dicynodont Pentasaurus have been found on Morobong Hill in the Mohales Hoek District of Lesotho.

Dinosaurs of the Elliot Formation

Suchians of the Elliot Formation

Synapsids of the Elliot Formation

References 

Geologic formations of Lesotho
Geologic formations of South Africa
Stormberg Group
Jurassic System of Africa
Early Jurassic Africa
Triassic System of Africa
Late Triassic Africa
Jurassic South Africa
Triassic South Africa
Norian Stage
Rhaetian Stage
Hettangian Stage
Limestone formations
Sandstone formations
Mudstone formations
Paleontology in Lesotho
Paleontology in South Africa
Karoo
Geography of the Eastern Cape
Geography of the Free State (province)
Mafeteng District
Maseru District
Quthing District